Geuzen was a name assumed by the confederacy of Calvinist Dutch nobles, who from 1566 opposed Spanish rule in the Netherlands. The most successful group of them operated at sea, and so were called Watergeuzen. In the Eighty Years' War, the Capture of Brielle by the Watergeuzen in 1572 provided the first foothold on land for the rebels, who would conquer the northern Netherlands and establish an independent Dutch Republic. They can be considered either as privateers or pirates, depending on the circumstances or motivations.

Origin of the name
The leaders of the nobles who signed a solemn league known as the Compromise of Nobles, by which they bound themselves to assist in defending the rights and liberties of the Netherlands against the civil and religious despotism of Philip II of Spain, were Louis of Nassau and Hendrick van Brederode. On 5 April 1566, permission was obtained for the confederates to present a petition of grievances, called the Request, to the regent, Margaret, Duchess of Parma. About 250 nobles marched to the palace accompanied by Louis of Nassau and Brederode. The regent was at first alarmed at the appearance of so large a body, but one of her councillors, Berlaymont, allegedly remarked "N'ayez pas peur Madame, ce ne sont que des gueux" ("Fear not madam, they are only beggars").

The appellation was not forgotten. In a speech at a great feast held by some 300 confederates at the Hotel Culemburg three days later, Brederode declared that if need be they were all ready to become beggars in their country's cause. Henceforward the name became a party title. The patriot party adopted the emblems of beggary, the wallet and the bowl, as trinkets to be worn on their hats or their girdles, and a medal was struck having on one side the head of Philip II, on the other two clasped hands with the motto Fidèle au roy, jusqu'à porter la besace ("Loyal to the King, up to carrying the beggar's pouch"). The original league of Beggars was short-lived, crushed by Alba, but its principles survived and were to be ultimately triumphant.

In the Dutch language the word geuzennaam is used for linguistic reappropriation: a pejorative term used with pride by the people called that way.

"Sea Beggars"

In 1569 William of Orange, who had now openly placed himself at the head of the party of revolt, granted letters of marque to a number of vessels manned by crews of desperadoes drawn from all nationalities. Eighteen ships received letters of marque, which were equipped by Louis of Nassau in the French Huguenot port of La Rochelle, which they continued to use as a base. 

The sea beggars were powerful military units that made capturing coastal cities easy. These privateers under the command of a succession of daring and reckless leaders, the best-known of whom is William de la Marck, Lord of Lumey, were called  "Sea Beggars", "Gueux de mer" in French, or "Watergeuzen" in Dutch. At first they were content merely to plunder both by sea and land, carrying their booty to the English ports where they were able to refit and replenish their stores. Already by the end of 1569, 84 Sea Beggars' ships were in action.

However, in 1572, Queen Elizabeth I of England abruptly refused to admit the Sea beggars to her harbours. No longer having refuge, the sea beggars, under the command of Willem Bloys van Treslong and Lenaert Jansz de Graeff, made a desperate attack upon Brielle, which they seized by surprise in the absence of the Spanish garrison on 1 April 1572. Encouraged by this success, they now sailed to Vlissingen, which was also taken by a coup de cul. The capture of these two towns prompted several nearby towns to declare their support for the revolt, starting a chain reaction that resulted in the majority of Holland joining in a general revolt of the Netherlands, and is regarded as the real beginning of Dutch independence.

In 1573 the Sea Beggars defeated a Spanish squadron under the command of Admiral Bossu off the port of Hoorn in the Battle on the Zuiderzee. Mixing with the native population, they quickly sparked rebellions against Duke of Alba in town after town and spread the resistance southward.

In 1574 the Sea Beggars, under Admiral Louis de Boisot participated in the lifting of the Siege of Leiden.

Some of the forefathers of the Dutch naval heroes began their naval careers as sea beggars, such as Evert Heindricxzen, the grandfather of Cornelis Evertsen the Elder.

Geuzen symbols

As part of a propaganda campaign including prints, pamphlets and much else, many Geuzen medals were created as badges of affiliation, using a wide range of symbolism, including that associated with the Ottoman Empire. William I of Orange sought Ottoman assistance against the Spanish king Philip II. 

The "Geuzen" were expressing their anti-Spanish and anti-Catholic sentiments. They considered the Turks to be less threatening than the Spaniards. During the years between 1579 and 1582, representatives from Grand Vizier Sokollu Mehmed Paşa travelled several times from Istanbul to Antwerp.<ref>{{cite book |title=Palais de Hollande in Istanbul: the embassy and envoys of the Netherlands since 1612 |page=19 |first=Marlies |last=Hoenkamp-Mazgon |location=Boom |year=2002 |isbn=9789750804403 |url=https://books.google.com/books?id=9zVpAAAAMAAJ&q=%22were+expressing+their+anti-Spanish+and+anti-Catholic%22 }}</ref>

There were, in fact, objective grounds for such an alliance. At the same time that the Dutch rebels were conducting their raids on Spanish shipping, the Ottoman Empire was involved in its own naval war with Spain, culminating in the 1571 Battle of Lepanto in Greece. For Spain to face a coordinated double-pronged naval challenge, by the Ottomans in the Mediterranean and the Dutch in north European waters, would be to the advantage of both of its foes.

The slogan Liever Turks dan Paaps seems to have been largely rhetorical, and their beggars medals in the form of a half moon were meant symbolically. The Dutch hardly contemplated life under the Sultan. Moreover, there was no direct contact between the Geuzen and the Turkish authorities. The Turks were considered infidels, and the heresy of Islam alone disqualified them from assuming a more central (or consistent) role in the rebels' propaganda.

In popular culture

 The Geuzen are featured very prominently in Dutch and Flemish popular novels, such as Charles de Coster's The Legend of Thyl Ulenspiegel and Lamme Goedzak and comics series such as Cori, de Scheepsjongen by Bob De Moor, Tijl Uilenspiegel and De Geuzen by Willy Vandersteen and Gilles de Geus by Hanco Kolk and Peter de Wit. In English they appear in Cecelia Holland's novel The Sea Beggars. 

 During the German occupation of The Netherlands in 1940-1945 an anti-German resistance group in the area of Vlaardingen, Maassluis and Rotterdam adopted the name of Geuzen.

 The Sea Beggars are also a unique unit of the Dutch Empire in Civilization V.

 The Sea Beggar is the mascot of Providence Christian College.

Gallery

See also
 Dutch Revolt
 Sea Dogs

Notes

References

Kervyn de Lettenhove, Les Huguenots et les Gueux, (six volumes, Brussels, 1882–85)
Renon de France, Histoire des causes de la désunion ... des Pays-Bas, (three volumes, Brussels, 1886–91)
Jurien de la Gravìere, "Les gueux de mer" in Revue des Deux Mondes (Paris, 1891–92).
Van der Horst (2005) Nederland: de vaderlandse geschiedenis van de prehistorie tot nu. (3rd edition; in Dutch). Amsterdam, Bert Bakker. . p. 132
McCabe, Ina Baghdiantz (2008) Orientalism in early Modern France'', Berg. 

Eighty Years' War (1566–1609)
Dutch words and phrases
Dutch rebels
16th-century rebels
Dutch pirates